Marcel Holovič (born September 12, 1987) is a Slovak professional ice hockey left winger for HK Trnava of the Slovak 1. Liga.

Holovič made his Slovak Extraliga debut with HK Nitra during the 2007–08 season. After spells with HK 36 Skalica and ŠHK 37 Piešťany, Holovič signed with MsHK Žilina. After two seasons, he moved to HKM Zvolen on June 8, 2018. He has played 530 games in the Slovak Extraliga up to the conclusion of the 2020–21 season.

Career statistics

Regular season and playoffs

References

External links

 

1987 births
Living people
Slovak ice hockey left wingers
Sportspeople from Trnava
HK Trnava players
HK Nitra players
HC '05 Banská Bystrica players
HK 36 Skalica players
ŠHK 37 Piešťany players
MsHK Žilina players
HKM Zvolen players
Bratislava Capitals players
HC Nové Zámky players